Space Island One (or Raumstation Unity in German) is a British/German science fiction television series that ran for 26 episodes beginning in 1998.  A co-production between the UK's Sky One channel and the German Vox channel, it starred Judy Loe as Kathryn McTiernan, the commander of the multinational crew of the space station Unity.

Among the screenwriters for the show were Stephen Baxter, P. J. Hammond, Adrian Rigelsford and Andy Lane.

Cast
Judy Loe as Commander Kathryn MacTiernan
Angus MacInnes as Lieutenant Commander Walter B. Shannon
Bruno Eyron as Dusan Kashkavian
Indra Ové as Paula Hernandez
William Oliver as Chief Science Officer Lyle Campbell
Julia Bremermann as Harriet "Harry" Eschenbach
Kourash Asad as Dr. Kaveh Homayuni
Sally Grace as the voice of Control
Charlie Bovenizer as the first baby born in space

Episodes

Season 1 (1998)

Season 2 (1998)

Reception
Described by Dave Bradley as “a mix of Moonbase 3 and Jupiter Moon, but more turgid than either," io9 described it as:

References

External links

Sky UK original programming
British science fiction television shows
Space adventure television series
1990s British science fiction television series
1998 British television series debuts
1998 British television series endings
1998 German television series debuts
1998 German television series endings
VOX (German TV channel) original programming